Yisroel Schulman, Esq. was the President & Attorney-in-Charge of the New York Legal Assistance Group (NYLAG), a 501 (c)(3) not-for-profit organization that provides free civil legal services to low-income New Yorkers. Prior to his inception of NYLAG, Mr. Schulman was a faculty member at the Benjamin N. Cardozo Law School of Yeshiva University. Concurrently, Mr. Schulman served as the Supervising Attorney for Cardozo Bet Tzedek Legal Services.

External links
 Reparing the World One Client at a Time
 In the Hands of a Troubled System
 Westchester Pledges New Rules in Child-Abuse Inquiries
 The Mayor Is Rebuffed On Welfare
 Home Care in New York, A Model Plan, Awaits Cuts

American lawyers

Living people
Year of birth missing (living people)